are a Japanese boy band formed on December 25, 2011, under Stardust Promotion. The group debuted under the name "" but later changed the name to "". The group consists of "main dancers" and "back vocalists", meaning that the vocalists stand behind the dancers when the band is performing. Bullet Train has been likened to Momoiro Clover Z, an idol girl group managed by the same talent agency. Consisting of 4 main dancers, the center among the dancers changes for each single. In 2018 they won their first award on MAMA2018 in Japan.

Members

Current 
As of August 2022, the group consists of 9 members.
  /           - 27 September 1994  -Main Dancer -Blue      -Mysterious

  /  - Leader  -23 Oktober 1994  -Main Dancer -Purple -Skinny 
  /  -24 November 1994 -Main Dancer        -Green -Muscle
  /          -Former Leader -2 January 1995  -Main Dancer -Red -Clumsy
  /  -23 September 1996 -Backup Vocal         -White -Youngest Child (Takashi the youngest member before Haru joined the group)
  /  -25 March 1995 -Backup Vocal
  /  -15 September 1998 -Main Dancer
  /  -26 Oktober 2000 -Main Dancer
  /       -31 March 2005 -Main Dancer

Former
  / 
  /   -18 June 1994 -Backup Vocal -Black
  /  -24 December 1995 -Main Dancer -Yellow

Timeline

Discography

Albums

Singles

Digital singles

References

External links 
 

Japanese boy bands
Japanese pop music groups
Musical groups established in 2011
2011 establishments in Japan
Stardust Promotion artists